Jéssica Rojas Sales (born 28 November 1980) is a Brazilian politician as well as a medic and gynocologist. She has spent his political career representing Acre, having served as federal deputy representative of Acre since 2015.

Personal life
Sales comes from a political family, being the daughter of the former mayor of Cruzeiro do Sul, Vagner Sales, and former congresswoman Antonia Sales. Before becoming a politician, sales worked as a medic, more specifically a gynecologist.

Political career
In the 2014 Brazilian general election Sales was elected to the Federal Chamber of Deputies with 20,339. She was the fifth most voted for candidate from Acre in the election.

Sales voted in favor of the impeachment motion of then-president Dilma Rousseff. She voted in favor of tax reforms and the 2017 Brazilian labor reform, and voted against opening a corruption investigation into Rousseff's successor Michel Temer.

References

1980 births
Living people
People from Acre (state)
Women gynaecologists
Brazilian Democratic Movement politicians
Members of the Chamber of Deputies (Brazil) from Acre
Brazilian women in politics